The 2014 Stu Sells Oakville Tankard was held from September 4 to 7 at the Oakville Curling Club in Oakville, Ontario as part of the 2014–15 World Curling Tour. It was held on the second week of the Tour, and was the first event (along with the Good Times Bonspiel) of the Women's Curling Tour. It was also the first event of the Ontario Curling Tour season, and acted as the Ontario Curling Tour championship of the previous season. Both the men's and women's event was held in a round robin format, and the purses for the men's and women's events were CAD$30,000 and CAD$24,000, respectively.

Mike McEwen and his rink from Winnipeg became the first team from outside of Ontario to win the men's event, defeating Toronto's John Epping rink in the final. On the women's side, it was an all-Swiss final, with Silvana Tirinzoni's rink defeating her compatriot, Alina Pätz in the final. It was the second time a team from outside Ontario won the event, and the first time that no Ontario rink made it to the final.

Men

Teams
The teams are listed as follows:

Round Robin Standings

Playoffs

Women

Teams
The teams are listed as follows:

Round Robin Standings

Playoffs

References

External links

Stu Sells Oakville Tankard
Oakville, Ontario
Curling in Ontario
Stu Sells Oakville Tankard
Stu Sells Oakville Tankard